Priscilla Rattazzi (born 1956) is an Italian-born photographer whose work has been featured for over four decades in international magazines, galleries and museum exhibitions.

Personal life 
Priscilla Rattazzi was born in Rome, Italy and came to the United States in the early seventies. She studied photography at Sarah Lawrence College and completed her graduation in 1977. She was featured in Richard Avedon’s “Avedon: Photographs 1947-1977 along with her aunt Marella Agnelli, models Dovima and Suzy Parker, and actresses Sophia Loren, Brigitte Bardot and Elizabeth Taylor. Rattazzi has been married three times; first to film producer Alex Ponti (m.1980; annul.1982) then to German investment banker Claus Moehlmann (m. 1984; div.1990) and to education entrepreneur Chris Whittle (m.1990; div.2022). She is the mother of three children, Maximilian Moehlmann, Andrea Whittle and Sasha Whittle.

Career 
Rattazzi worked as assistant to photographer Hiro from 1977 to 1978, then became a fashion and portrait photographer in New York throughout the 1980’s.  Her photographs were published in Brides, Self, Redbook, New York and The New York Times Magazine. In Italy, her work appeared in Vogue Italia, Donna and Amica. Rattazzi has authored five books and one limited-edition portfolio. She has been the recipient of ten one-woman gallery exhibitions, and one museum show. Her latest show: HOODOOLAND (Staley-Wise gallery 2020) was featured in The New York Times, as well as in Town & Country, AirMail and La Repubblica. In January 2022, Rattazzi was an invited speaker at The Society of The Four Arts in Palm Beach, Florida.

Books:

 “Una Famiglia” was Priscilla’s first book. It was privately printed for her mother’s 60th birthday and was a family album of the Agnelli family.

Published books:

 “Best Friends” is a collection of photographs of people with their dogs (Rizzoli, 1989)
 “Children” is a collection of photographs of children in early childhood (Rizzoli, 1992)
 “Georgica Pond”  is a ten-year examination of a body of water on the East End of Long Island (Callaway, 2000)
 “Luna & Lola” is the story of Priscilla's two dogs, a golden retriever and a dachshund; a metaphorical tale of family life (Callaway, 2010)

Museum and gallery shows:

 Staley-Wise Gallery, New York. In conjunction with the publication of her book Best Friends (1989)
 Knoxville Museum of Art, Knoxville, Tennessee (1992)
 Glenn Horowitz Bookseller, East Hampton, New York (2003)
 Jack Banning Gallery, New York. A series of portraits of actors, producers and directors for the Tribeca Film Festival (2003)
 Valentina Moncada Gallery, Rome, Italy (2004)
 East End Books and Gallery, East Hampton, New York (2006)
 Paul Fisher Gallery, West Palm Beach, Florida (2008)
 Ralph Lauren stores in East Hampton and Milan. In conjunction with the launch of her book Luna & Lola (2010)
 Staley-Wise gallery, New York. “Selected Photographs”: 1975-2013 (2014)
 Staley-Wise gallery, New York. “HOODOOLAND”, a series of photographs of rock formations taken in 2018-2019 around Grand Staircase-Escalante National Monument, Utah. (2020)

References

1956 births
Living people
Agnelli family
American women photographers
American photographers
Italian photographers
Italian women photographers
People educated at Atlantic College
People educated at a United World College
Date of birth missing (living people)
Italian emigrants to the United States
Italian nobility
Sarah Lawrence College alumni
21st-century American women